The following television stations operate on virtual channel 15 in the United States:

 K04GT-D in Bullhead City, Arizona
 K05NL-D in Reno, Nevada
 K06PT-D in Columbia, Missouri
 K06QL-D in Modesto, California
 K13ZL-D in Fresno, California
 K15AA-D in Hugo, Oklahoma
 K15AF-D in Petersburg, Alaska
 K15AP-D in Moose Pass, Alaska
 K15AT-D in Kodiak, Alaska
 K15AU-D in Pilot Station, Alaska
 K15CU-D in Salinas, California
 K15FC-D in Twentynine Palms, California
 K15FJ-D in Lakeport, California
 K15HV-D in Chico, California
 K15IQ-D in Astoria, Oregon
 K15IS-D in Willmar, Minnesota
 K15JL-D in Billings, Montana
 K15KC-D in Yakima, Washington
 K15KP-D in St. Louis, Missouri
 K15MW-D in Bellingham, Washington
 K19KV-D in Prescott, Arizona
 K20OM-D in Beaumont, Texas
 K21NQ-D in Meadview, Arizona
 K23FZ-D in Camp Verde, Arizona
 K24KS-D in Flagstaff, Arizona
 K24NG-D in Lake Havasu City, Arizona
 K24OJ-D in Uvalde, Texas
 K26PI-D in Kansas City, Kansas
 K27DA-D in Big Sandy Valley, Arizona
 K27NT-D in Golden Valley, Arizona
 K29NL-D in Wichita, Kansas
 K30LL-D in Kingman, Arizona
 K30MG-D in Kirksville, Missouri
 K31HY-D in Needles, etc., California
 K31PA-D in Dolan Springs, Arizona
 K33NZ-D in Cottonwood, Arizona
 K35EE-D in Moccasin, Arizona
 KABY-LD in Sioux Falls, South Dakota
 KADN-TV in Lafayette, Louisiana
 KAUO-LD in Amarillo, Texas
 KBWF-LD in Sioux City, Iowa
 KCKA in Centralia, Washington
 KCLO-TV in Rapid City, South Dakota
 KFVD-LD in Porterville, California
 KHPZ-CD in Round Rock, Texas
 KINC in Las Vegas, Nevada
 KIUA-LD in Lincoln, Nebraska
 KLMV-LD in Laredo, Texas
 KMSQ-LD in Mesquite, Nevada
 KNTL-LD in Laughlin, Nevada
 KNXV-TV in Phoenix, Arizona
 KOGG in Wailuku, Hawaii
 KOOG-LD in Bozeman, Montana
 KORX-CD in Walla Walla, Washington
 KORY-CD in Eugene, Oregon
 KPBS in San Diego, California
 KPIF in Pocatello, Idaho
 KPOB-TV in Poplar Bluff, Missouri
 KSMQ-TV in Austin, Minnesota
 KTEL-CD in Albuquerque, New Mexico
 KUNA-LD in Indio, California
 KUPU in Waimanalo, Hawaii
 KUTB-LD in Salt Lake City, Utah
 KUTO-LD in Logan, Utah
 KVHC-LD in Kerrville, Texas
 KVRR in Fargo, North Dakota
 KVVK-CD in Kennewick, etc., Washington
 KVVV-LD in Houston, Texas
 KWJM-LD in Minneapolis, Minnesota
 KXBK-LD in Bismarck, North Dakota
 KXVA in Abilene, Texas
 KXVO in Omaha, Nebraska
 KYOU-TV in Ottumwa, Iowa
 KYUK-LD in Bethel, Alaska
 KYUM-LD in Yuma, Arizona
 W15BU-D in Johnson City, Illinois
 W15DF-D in Houghton Lake, Michigan
 W15DS-D in Bangor, Maine
 W25AA-D in Onancock, Virginia
 W31EG-D in Tampa, Florida
 WANE-TV in Fort Wayne, Indiana
 WBNF-CD in Buffalo, New York
 WBRA-TV in Roanoke, Virginia
 WBTS-CD in Nashua, New Hampshire
 WBXM-CD in Montgomery, Alabama
 WDSC-TV in New Smyrna Beach, Florida
 WEPT-CD in Newburgh, New York
 WFXW in Greenville, Mississippi
 WHDF in Florence, Alabama
 WHPS-CD in Detroit, Michigan
 WHRO-TV in Hampton-Norfolk, Virginia
 WICD in Champaign, Illinois
 WKHD-LD in Mayaguez, Puerto Rico
 WKOP-TV in Knoxville, Tennessee
 WKPC-TV in Louisville, Kentucky
 WMTV in Madison, Wisconsin
 WOLP-CD in Grand Rapids, Michigan
 WPDE-TV in Florence, South Carolina
 WPMI-TV in Mobile, Alabama
 WREP-LD in Martinsville, Indiana
 WSJT-LD in Atlantic City, New Jersey
 WTAP-TV in Parkersburg, West Virginia
 WTFL-LD in Tallahassee, Florida
 WTNX-LD in Nashville, Tennessee
 WXBU in Lancaster, Pennsylvania
 WXSP-CD in Grand Rapids, Michigan
 WYBM-LD in Westmoreland, New Hampshire
 WYYW-CD in Evansville, Indiana
 WZVC-LD in Athens, Georgia

The following station, which is no longer licensed, formerly operated on virtual channel 15:
 K10RM-D in Kingman, Arizona
 K15IC-D in Weed, California
 K15IL-D in John Day, Oregon
 KEID-LD in Lufkin, Texas
 KGHZ in Springfield, Missouri
 WBDI-LD in Springfield, Illinois
 WCZA-LD in Marion, Indiana
 WDDZ-LD in Augusta, Georgia
 WLLB-LD in Portland, Maine
 WSFD-LD in Perry, Florida

References

15 virtual